In linguistics, allocutive agreement (abbreviated  or ) refers to a morphological feature in which the gender of an addressee is marked overtly in an utterance using fully grammaticalized markers even if the addressee is not referred to in the utterance. The term was first used by Louis Lucien Bonaparte in 1862.

Basque
See also Basque verbs: Familiar forms and allocutive indices (hika).

In Basque, allocutive forms are required in the verb forms of a main clause when the speaker uses the familiar (also called "intimate") pronoun  "thou" (as opposed to formal  "you"). In Basque, allocutive agreement involves the grammatical marking of the gender of the addressee in the verb form itself.

Grammatically this is done by introducing an additional additional person marker in the verb form (marked ALL):

versus

Eastern dialects have expanded on this by adding the polite (formerly plural) pronoun  to the system; in some, hypocoristic palatalization converts this to :

Some varieties have done away with the unmarked forms except in subordinate clauses:  vs.  'that I go'

Its use is diminishing, especially the feminine forms.

Basque speakers who use allocutive agreement sometimes apply the masculine forms to women, making  a genderless marker of solidarity.

Beja
Beja, a Cushitic language, has allocutive forms, marking the gender of a masculine addressee with the clitic =a and with =i for feminine addressees:

{| class=wikitable
|rihja=heːb=a
|-
|see.-PST.3SG=1SG ACC=ALL.MASC 2SG
|-
|He saw me (said to a man)
|-
|}

{| class=wikitable
|rihja=heːb=i
|-
|see.-PST.3SG=1SG ACC=ALL.FEM 2SG
|-
|He saw me (said to a woman)
|-
|}

See also
Basque language

References

External links 
Allocutive agreement at Everything2.com

Linguistic morphology
Grammar
Grammatical gender
Basque language